The Hualien County Government is the local government of the Republic of China that governs Hualien County.

Organizational structure
 Department of Civil Affairs
 Department of Finance
 Department of Public Works
 Department of Urban/Rural Development
 Agriculture Bureau

See also
 Hualien County Council

References

External links

 

Hualien County
Local governments of the Republic of China